IAI is an acronym for:

 IAI alphabet, another name for Africa Alphabet
 Iaido
 Information Architecture Institute
 Institute of Art and Ideas
 Inter-American Institute for Global Change Research
 International African Institute
 International Association for Identification
 Israel Aerospace Industries (Ha-Taasiya Ha-Avirit)
 Islamic Army in Iraq
 Independent Administrative Institution
 Intelligent Actuator (International Automation Industry), Japanese robot maker
 Istituto Affari Internazionali (Italian Institute of International Affairs)